The Parachucla Formation is a geologic formation in Florida. It preserves fossils dating back to the Paleogene period.

Fossil content

Mammals

Fish

Invertebrates

See also

 List of fossiliferous stratigraphic units in Florida

References

 

Paleogene Florida